Jinhae Air Base  also known as Chinhae Air Base is a naval airfield of the Republic of Korea Navy in Jinhae, South Korea.

History
The airfield was originally established in 1942 as the 51st Navy Aircraft Factory (formerly 21st Navy Aircraft Factory Chinkai Branch) under the Chinkai Guard District, which was a major navy base for the Imperial Japanese Navy in Korea under Japanese rule. The Republic of Korea Marine Corps (ROKMC) was founded at the airfield (then known as Deoksan airfield) on April 15, 1949.

Korean War
During the Korean War the USAF designated the airfield as Chinhae Air Base and K-10 Chinhae. The field was refurbished with a Marsden Matting surface over crushed gravel.

USAF units stationed at Chinhae included:
18th Operations Group from 9 December 1950 – 2 June 1952
18th Fighter-Bomber Wing operating F-51s from mid December 1950 Component units were:
 12th Fighter-Bomber Squadron
 67th Fighter-Bomber Squadron
 39th Fighter-Interceptor Squadron (March 1951 – March 1952)
 75th Air Depot Wing (arrived from U.S. in 1952)

UN units stationed at Chinhae included:
 2 Squadron SAAF operating F-51s attached to the 18th Fighter-Bomber Wing (November 1950 – March 1951, April 1951 – June 1953)

Incidents and accidents
24 August 1950, USAF C-47B #45-1126 was written off in a landing accident.
17 May 1951, F-51D #44-74822 crashed on landing, the aircraft was written off.
8 July 1951, USAF C-47D #44-77269 crashed on takeoff due to an engine failure, the aircraft was written off.
11 July 1951, F-51D #44-74495 crashed, the aircraft was written off.
17 September 1951, F-51D #44-74014 crashed on landing, the aircraft was written off.
8 October 1951, F-51D #44-74592 crashed on takeoff, the aircraft was written off.

Airlines and destinations
No scheduled services.

References

External links
 
 

Airports in South Korea
Korean War air bases